Up the Junction is the first soundtrack and fourth studio album by Manfred Mann, consisting of songs written by Mann and Mike Hugg for the 1968 film of the same name. The album was released on 16 March 1968 on Fontana Records (TL/STL 546023/2/68).

Track listing  
Side one
"Up the Junction" vocal (Mike Hugg, Manfred Mann) – 4:38
"Sing Songs of Love" (Mick Gill, Hugg, Mann) – 2:01
"Walking Round" (Hugg) – 2:17
"Up the Junction" instrumental (Hugg) – 1:12
"Love Theme" instrumental (Hugg, Mann) – 2:15
"Up the Junction" vocal and instrumental (Hugg) – 1:48
Side two
"Just for Me" (Hugg) – 2:26
"Love Theme" instrumental (Hugg, Mann) – 2:03
"Sheila's Dance" (Hugg, Mann) – 2:04
"Belgravia" (Hugg, Mann) – 2:46
"Wailing Horn" (Hugg, Mann) – 2:24
"I Need Your Love" (Hugg) – 1:41
"Up the Junction" vocal (Hugg) – 2:15

2004 CD bonus tracks
"Eastern Street" (Peter Cowap) - 2:28
"Mohair Sam" (Dallas Frazier) - 3:16
"Love Bird" - 3:03
"Brown and Porters (Meat Exporters)" (Geoff Stephens, John Carter) - 2:31
"I Love You" - 2:48
"I Think It's Going to Rain Today" (Randy Newman) - 3:30
"Budgie" (Mike D'Abo) - 2:38
"Sitting Alone in the Sunshine" - 2:24
"Please Mrs. Henry" (Bob Dylan) - 3:09

All tracks previously released on the 1997 compilation Ascent of Mann.

References

Manfred Mann albums
Drama film soundtracks
1968 soundtrack albums
Albums produced by Shel Talmy
Fontana Records soundtracks
Single-artist film soundtracks